Schertel is a surname. Notable people with the surname include: 

Ernst Schertel (1884–1958), German author
Fritz Schertel (1890–1945), German cellist, brother of Ernst

German-language surnames